The Ministry of National Defence ( or MDN) is a Portuguese government ministry, which is responsible for preparing and executing the national defense policy, within the scope of its powers, as well as ensuring and supervising the administration of the Portuguese Armed Forces.

Mission 

 Participate in the definition of the national defense policy and elaborate and execute the policy related to its military component;
 Ensure and supervise the administration of the Armed Forces;
 Ensure the preparation of the means available to the Armed Forces and monitor and inspect their use;
 Define, execute and coordinate human, material and financial resources policies;
 Coordinate and guide actions related to the satisfaction of military commitments arising from international agreements, as well as relations with international organizations of a military nature, without prejudice to the Ministry of Foreign Affairs' own attributions;
 Prepare the Ministry's budget and guide the drafting of draft proposals for the Military Programming Law (LPM), coordinating and supervising the respective execution;
 Support the financing of actions, through the attribution of subsidies and the execution of transfers within the scope of the programs that are committed to it;
 To promote and dynamize the study, investigation, technological development and dissemination of matters of interest to national defense;
 Provide, in order to guarantee, the security of classified matters, either in Portugal or in national representations abroad;
 Perform the functions assigned to it within the scope of the Information System of the Portuguese Republic;
 Provide technical and administrative support to the Superior Council for National Defense and the Prime Minister, in the exercise of their functions, in matters of national defense and the Armed Forces.

Organization 

The Ministry of National Defense is structured as follows:

 Armed forces:
 Armed Forces General Staff;
 Portuguese Navy;
 Portuguese Army;
 Portuguese Air Force.

 Central services integrated in the direct administration:
 General secretary:
 Directorate-General for National Defense Policy;
 Directorate-General for National Defense Resources;
 General Inspection of National Defense;
 National Defense Institute;
 Military Judicial Police.
 Authorities:
 Maritime Authority System;
 National Aeronautical Authority.

 Commissions:
 Coordinating Committee for the Evocation of the Centenary of World War I;
 Portuguese Military History Commission.

 Tutored bodies:
 Armed Forces Social Action Institute
 Portuguese Red Cross;
 League of Combatants.

References

External links
  

Portugal
National Defence
Ministries established in 1950
1950 establishments in Portugal

Military of Portugal
Portugal
Portugal